Kubaan is a settlement in the mountainous interior of Sarawak, Malaysia, about two days' walk from Bario. Neighbouring settlements include:

References

Populated places in Sarawak